Torvastad is a former municipality in Rogaland county, Norway.  The municipality existed from 1838 until 1965.  The administrative centre was the village of Haugesund (from 1838 until 1855), and after that it was the village of Torvastad on the island of Karmøy.  Today, the area of Torvastad refers to the northern part of the municipality (and island) of Karmøy.

Torvastad municipality originally encompassed parts of the present-day municipalities of Haugesund, Utsira, and Karmøy. The municipality included the northwesternmost part of the mainland of Rogaland county plus the northern part of the island of Karmøy and the islands of Utsira, Røvær, Vibrandsøy, and Feøy.

Name
The municipality (originally the parish) is named after the old Torvastad farm, since the first Torvastad Church was built there. The first element is the genitive form of the male name Torfi and the last element is staðir which means 'farm'.  Thus, the "farm of Torfi".

History
The parish of Torvestad was established as a municipality on 1 January 1838 (see formannskapsdistrikt law). On 1 February 1855 the village of Haugesund was declared a "ladested" (port of lading) and it was separated from Torvastad to form a municipality of its own. The split left Torvastad with 3,242 inhabitants.  On 1 November 1881, most of the mainland part of Torvastad was separated to form the new municipality of Skaare.  This left Torvastad with 1,918 residents. The island of Utsira was separated from Torvastad on 1 July 1924 to form the new municipality of Utsira.  After the split, Torvastad was left with 2,187 residents.

On 1 January 1965, Torvastad municipality was dissolved upon recommendations of the Schei Committee.  The small island of Vibrandsøy (population: 70) was transferred to the municipality of Haugesund. The rest of Torvastad, with 3,783 inhabitants, was merged with the neighboring municipalities of Avaldsnes, Kopervik, Skudenes, Skudeneshavn, Stangaland, and Åkra to form the new, much larger municipality of Karmøy.

Government
All municipalities in Norway, including Torvastad, are responsible for primary education (through 10th grade), outpatient health services, senior citizen services, unemployment and other social services, zoning, economic development, and municipal roads.  The municipality is governed by a municipal council of elected representatives, which in turn elects a mayor.

Municipal council
The municipal council  of Torvastad was made up of 17 representatives that were elected to four year terms.  The party breakdown of the final municipal council was as follows:

See also
List of former municipalities of Norway

References

Haugesund
Karmøy
Former municipalities of Norway
1838 establishments in Norway
1965 disestablishments in Norway